The 2000 AFL Grand Final was an Australian rules football game contested between the Melbourne Football Club and the Essendon Football Club, held at the Melbourne Cricket Ground in Melbourne on 2 September 2000 rather than in its usual last Saturday of September date to avoid conflicting with the 2000 Summer Olympics in Sydney. It was the 104th annual grand final of the Australian Football League (formerly the Victorian Football League), staged to determine the premiers for the 2000 AFL season. The match, attended by 96,249 spectators, was won by Essendon by a margin of 60 points, marking that club's 16th premiership and thereby equalling the record for the most VFL/AFL premierships.

Background

This was Essendon's first appearance in a grand final since winning the 1993 AFL Grand Final, whilst it was Melbourne's first since losing the 1988 VFL Grand Final.

In the previous week's preliminary finals, Essendon defeated Carlton by 45 points, while Melbourne defeated North Melbourne by 50 points. The following Monday saw Melbourne's Shane Woewodin awarded the Brownlow Medal with 24 votes, ahead of Western Bulldogs midfielder Scott West and Adelaide midfielder Andrew McLeod.

Essendon won the most home-and-away games (21) and total games (24) in a single season in the history of the VFL/AFL, breaking the records set by Carlton in 1995 (20 and 23, respectively), and they broke Collingwood's 1929 record when it won its first twenty games; if the pre-season cup is included, Essendon won 30 games out of 31; all of these records still stand. In 2008, Geelong won 21 of 22 games in the home-and-away season to equal that record, but they lost the grand final. Essendon's grand final win was the last by a Victorian side until Geelong won in 2007.

Match summary
Melbourne captain David Neitz won the toss and chose to kick towards the City/Members end of the MCG in the opening quarter. The first score of the game went to Melbourne. Neitz, from a very tight angle near the behind post on the Members side of the goals, kicked the ball into the far goal post resulting in one point.

It was only a short time after the first score of the game that James Hird kicked the first goal of the game for Essendon. Melbourne's first goal was kicked by Stephen Powell.

The Bombers never looked threatened from after quarter time and comfortably won its record-equaling 16th premiership by 60 points after arguably the most dominant season in VFL/AFL history.

One downside for the Bombers was an incident in which Melbourne's Troy Simmonds was hit high by Essendon's Michael Long, resulting in a 25-man brawl. Simmonds was taken from the field on a stretcher; nine players were reported on ten offences by the umpires.

Hird was awarded the Norm Smith Medal for being judged the best player afield. Paul Barnard and Matthew Lloyd each kicked four goals for the Bombers.

Essendon's triumph would be the last by any Victorian team until the 2007 AFL Grand Final when Geelong won its first premiership in 44 years.

The National Anthem was sung by Tania Doko of Bachelor Girl.

Teams

Scorecard

See also 
 2000 AFL season
 1948 VFL Grand Final
 1957 VFL Grand Final

References

Match Stats

Notes

External links
AFL Website

VFL/AFL Grand Finals
2000 Australian Football League season
Afl Grand Final, 2000
Essendon Football Club
Melbourne Football Club